The 1986 UAAP men's basketball tournament was the 49th year of the men's tournament of the University Athletic Association of the Philippines (UAAP)'s basketball championship. Hosted by National University, the UP Fighting Maroons defeated the UE Red Warriors in the finals taking their first UAAP men's basketball championship in 47 years. Prior to the start of the season, De La Salle University was admitted as the eighth member school of the league.

Elimination round
Tournament format:
Double round robin; the two teams with the best records advance Finals:
The #1 seed will only need to win once to clinch the championship.
The #2 seed has to win twice to clinch the championship.

Finals
Number 1 seed UE only has to win once, while number 2 seed UP has to win twice, to clinch the championship.

Most Valuable Player: Eric Altamirano

After 47 years of frustration, the State University, which is more famous for producing personalities from the various spectrum of the society, finally made a name for itself in the field of varsity basketball.

After five years of bench bitterness, Lipa, the new miracle man of amateur caging, realized an elusive dream which had slipped from his hand twice in the last five years.

The dying seconds of the winner-take-all UP-University of the East clash seemed a lifetime for Lipa, the players and the throngs of pro-Maroons crowd. The UP lead was already insurmountable, yet in everyone's mind was the wounds of the 1983 championship to Far Eastern University.

The fans were kept at the edge of their seats by the last ditch, desperate fullcourt press by the dethroned Warriors, proud owners of 18 UAAP titles. A pocket of UP supporters at the gallery were undecided whether to unfurl the championship streamer or not. The Maroons were leading FEU in 1983, only to lose by a slim margin. Finally, the final horn blared and all frustrations were erased.

See also
NCAA Season 62 basketball tournaments

References

49
1986 in Philippine basketball